İncirli is a village in the Nurdağı District, Gaziantep Province, Turkey. The village is inhabited by Alevi Turks and had a population of 539 in 2022.

References

Villages in Nurdağı District